Ramtane Lamamra (born 15 June 1952) is an Algerian diplomat and former Minister of Foreign Affairs of Algeria. He was the African Union's Commissioner for Peace and Security from 2008 to 2013 and Minister of Foreign Affairs from 2013 to 2017 and briefly in March 2019.

Early life and education
Born at Amizour in Béjaïa Province, Lamamra studied at the École nationale d'administration in Algiers.

Career
Lamamra was appointed as Algeria's Ambassador to Ethiopia and Djibouti, as well the Organization of African Unity and the United Nations Economic Commission for Africa, in 1989. He was Chairman of the Board of Governors of the International Atomic Energy Agency from 1992 to 1993. Subsequently, he was appointed as Algeria's Permanent Representative to the United Nations in 1993, and he served as Ambassador to the United States from 1996 to 1999.

From 1 August 2005 until 7 July 2007 he was Secretary-General of the Ministry of Foreign Affairs. He was elected as the African Union's Commissioner for Peace and Security in early 2008, taking office on 28 April 2008. He succeeded another Algerian diplomat, Said Djinnit, in that post.

Lamamra was appointed to the Algerian government as Minister of Foreign Affairs on 11 September 2013; consequently he left his post as AU Commissioner for Peace and Security.

After nearly four years as Minister of Foreign Affairs, Lamamra was dismissed from the government on 25 May 2017.

On 5 October 2017, Lamamra was appointed by the Chairperson of the African Union, Moussa Faki Mahamat, as the High Representative for Silencing the Guns in Africa. 
Recently, he also became a member of the High-Level Group of the Africa-Europe Foundation.

On 7 July 2021, his return to the post of foreign minister was announced, as part of a cabinet reshuffle.

He is a member of the Cosmos Club and the University Club of Washington DC.

Other activities
 Africa Europe Foundation (AEF), Member of the High-Level Group of Personalities on Africa-Europe Relations (since 2020)

Honours
 :  Grand Cross of Order of the Liberator General San Martin
 : Commander of the National Order of the Niger
  : Commander of the Order of Merit

See also
List of Ministers of Foreign Affairs of Algeria
Foreign relations of Algeria

References

External links
Ministry of Foreign Affairs of Algeria

|-

|-

1952 births
Living people
Ambassadors of Algeria to the United States
Ambassadors of Algeria to Austria
Foreign ministers of Algeria
Permanent Representatives of Algeria to the United Nations
21st-century Algerian people
Grand Crosses of the Order of the Liberator General San Martin
Commanders of the Order of Merit (Portugal)